Uccle-Calevoet railway station is a railway station in the municipality of Uccle in Brussels, Belgium. The station is operated by the National Railway Company of Belgium and located on line 124 between the stations of Uccle-Stalle and Linkebeek. It is named after the neighbourhood of Calevoet in Uccle.

Trains calling at Uccle-Calevoet are local trains running from Nivelles to Brussels-North, Nivelles to Antwerp-Central. The station is connected to the Brussels tram route 51 as well as the Brussels bus routes 43 and 60.

Train services 
The station is served by the following service(s):

Brussels RER services (S1) Antwerp – Mechelen – Brussels – Waterloo – Nivelles (weekdays)
Brussels RER services (S1) Brussels – Waterloo – Nivelles (weekends)

References 

Railway stations in Brussels
Uccle
Railway stations opened in 1873